Ysgol Maes Y Gwendraeth is a bilingual secondary school for pupils aged between 11 and 18 years, situated in Cefneithin, Carmarthenshire, Wales. The school was opened  following the amalgamation of Ysgol Maes yr Yrfa and Ysgol y Gwendraeth secondary schools in 2013. As of 2017, there are 841 pupils on roll, with 157 pupils in the sixth form.

Welsh is the official language of the school on a daily basis and is the administrative and social medium of communication. The school is categorized linguistically by Welsh Government as a category 2A school. It means that at least 80% of subjects apart from English and Welsh are taught only through the medium of Welsh to all pupils. However, one or two subjects are taught to some pupils in English or in both languages. The school states that all subjects are taught through the medium of Welsh, excluding English and Science (which is taught through the pupils’ chosen language from Year 8 onwards).

References 

Secondary schools in Carmarthenshire
1928 establishments in Wales